Krishna Khatri   (Nepali: कृष्णा खत्री) is a Nepali woman's footballer who has played for the Nepal women's national football team.

References

Living people
Nepal women's international footballers
Year of birth missing (living people)
Nepalese women's footballers
Women's association footballers not categorized by position
South Asian Games silver medalists for Nepal
South Asian Games medalists in football